Pentabamate (S-109) is a tranquilizer of the carbamate family.

References 

Carbamates
Sedatives
GABAA receptor positive allosteric modulators